Wheatland is a census-designated place (CDP) in Broadwater County, Montana, United States. The population was 568 according to the 2010 census.

Geography
Wheatland occupies a large area in the southern end of Broadwater County. U.S. Route 287 runs north-south through the CDP, intersecting Interstate 90 at Exit 274 of that highway. Montana Highway 2 leads east across the Jefferson River to the city of Three Forks in Gallatin County.

Demographics

References

Census-designated places in Broadwater County, Montana
Census-designated places in Montana